Jerome L. Blaska (July 4, 1919 – May 2, 2000) was a member of the Wisconsin State Assembly.

Biography
Blaska was born on July 4, 1919, in Sun Prairie, Wisconsin to John M. Blaska and Rose Schuster Blaska. His father, John, was also a member of the Assembly. During World War II, he served in the United States Army in the Aleutian Islands. Blaska later became a member of the Veterans of Foreign Wars and the American Legion. In 1948, he married Helen Curl. They had six children, two of whom became supervisors of Dane County, Wisconsin. Blaska died on May 2, 2000. He was Roman Catholic.

Political career
Blaska was elected to the Assembly in 1959 and was re-elected in 1960, 1962, and 1964. In addition, he was a member of the Sun Prairie School Board. He was a Democrat.

References

External links

People from Sun Prairie, Wisconsin
Catholics from Wisconsin
Democratic Party members of the Wisconsin State Assembly
Military personnel from Wisconsin
United States Army soldiers
United States Army personnel of World War II
1919 births
2000 deaths
20th-century American politicians
Burials in Wisconsin